Jacob Olofsson (born 8 February 2000) is a Swedish ice hockey centre currently playing for IF Björklöven of the HockeyAllsvenskan (Allsv).  Olofsson was selected by the Montreal Canadiens with the 56th overall pick in the 2018 NHL Entry Draft.

Playing career
Olofsson was awarded the Guldgallret, which recognizes the best junior player in the HockeyAllsvenskan, during the 2017–18 season after helping Timrå IK get promoted to the SHL.

Following the 2018–19 season, unable to prevent Timrå IK from being relegated after a lone season in the SHL, Olofsson in order to continue his development was signed to remain in the top flight SHL, agreeing to a two-year contract with Skellefteå AIK on April 15, 2019.

During the 2021–22 season, after a loan stint with Frölunda HC, Olofsson returned to Timrå IK before opting to leave the club on a permanent basis in joining Allsvenskan club, IF Björklöven, on 31 December 2021.

Career statistics

Regular season and playoffs

International

References

External links
 

2000 births
Living people
IF Björklöven players
Frölunda HC players
Montreal Canadiens draft picks
Swedish ice hockey centres
Skellefteå AIK players
Timrå IK players
People from Piteå
Sportspeople from Norrbotten County